Saland railway station is a railway station in the Swiss canton of Zürich. The station is situated in the municipality of Bauma and takes its name from the nearby village of Saland. It is located on the Tösstalbahn between Winterthur and Rapperswil, and is served by Zürich S-Bahn line S26.

References

External links 
 

Railway stations in the canton of Zürich
Swiss Federal Railways stations